Pyon Yong-rip (September 20, 1929 - November 15, 2016) was a politician of the Democratic People's Republic of Korea (North Korea). He served as secretary of the standing committee of the Supreme People's Assembly and was a member of the 6th Political Bureau of the 6th Central Committee of the Workers' Party of Korea .

Biography
Born in 1929 Chaeryong County, Hwanghae Province during the Japanese colonial period, he once spent an early childhood in Haeju, Hwanghae-do and Daedong, Pyeongannam-do during the Japanese colonial period. He joined the Korean People's Army on September 2, 1950. He earned a Bachelor of Science degree in Physics at Kim Il-sung University. On February 29, 1968, he was promoted as the Lieutenant of the Ground Forces of the Korean People's Army, and served as Deputy Director of the Department of Education, Kim Il-Sung University, Deputy Minister of Higher Education, Deputy Director of the Ministry of Education, Vice President of the National Academy of Sciences, North Korea's Ministry of Education and Director of the National Academy of Sciences. Since July 2009, he has served as secretary of the Standing Committee of the Supreme People's Assembly until 2012 when he was replaced by Thae Hyong-chol. At the representative meeting of the Workers' Party of Korea in September 2010, he was elected a member of the Political Bureau of the Central Committee of the Workers' Party of Korea.

References

Members of the Supreme People's Assembly
Government ministers of North Korea
1929 births
2016 deaths
People from South Hwanghae
People from Chaeryong County
Members of the 6th Politburo of the Workers' Party of Korea
Members of the 6th Central Committee of the Workers' Party of Korea